Fertitta may refer to:

People
Frank Fertitta, Jr. (1938-2009), American businessman.
Frank Fertitta III (born 1962), American businessman.
Lorenzo Fertitta (born 1968), American businessman.
Tilman J. Fertitta (born 1957), American businessman.